Structural maintenance of chromosomes protein 1B (SMC-1B) is a protein that in humans is encoded by the SMC1B gene. SMC-1B belongs to a family of proteins required for chromatid cohesion and DNA recombination during meiosis and mitosis.
SMC1ß protein appears to participate with other cohesins REC8, STAG3 and SMC3 in sister-chromatid cohesion throughout the whole meiotic process in human oocytes.

References

Further reading